Vladyslav Oleksandrovych Kabayev (born 1 September 1995) is a Ukrainian professional footballer who plays as a striker for Dynamo Kyiv in the Ukrainian Premier League.

Club career

Early years
Kabayev is a product of the Chornomorets Odesa youth system.

Chornomorets Odesa
He made his debut for Chornomorets Odesa against Dynamo Kyiv on 30 August 2014 in the Ukrainian Premier League.

References

External links
 
 
 

1995 births
Living people
Footballers from Odesa
Ukrainian footballers
Ukraine youth international footballers
Association football forwards
FC Chornomorets Odesa players
FC Chornomorets-2 Odesa players
FC Zorya Luhansk players
Ukrainian Premier League players
Ukrainian Second League players
Ukraine under-21 international footballers
FC Dynamo Kyiv players